H26 may refer to:
 Hanriot H.26, a French prototype fighter aircraft
 Herreshoff H-26, an American sailboat design
 , a 1918 British Royal Navy H class submarine
 Other cataract ICD-10 code